Seteh may refer to:
Set_(mythology)
Seteh, Iran, a village in Kermanshah Province, Iran